The Bangladesh Economic Zones Authority or BEZA is an agency of the government of Bangladesh to govern special economic zones within the country's territory. It was instituted by the government in November 2010 under Bangladesh Economic Zones Act, 2010. The organisation is responsible for establishing and managing of SEZs of Bangladesh. It is run from Prime Minister's Office of Bangladesh. Shaikh Yusuf Harun is Executive Chairman of the Bangladesh Economic Zones Authority.

History 
As the Government of Bangladesh took the initiative to become a developed nation under Vision 2041, the government plans to set up at least 100 public and private SEZs across the country. Bangladesh Economic Zones Authority was founded through the Bangladesh Economic Zones Act 2010 and established in November 2010 with topmost priority to attract more FDI and to increase and diversify country's export to the world. The agency reports to the Prime Minister's Office. Prime Minister Sheikh Hasina is the present chair of the agency. In 2015 the private export processing zones were placed under its authority.

Structure
BEZA consists of two boards: Governing Board, Executive Board. the chairman of Governing Board is the Prime Minister and members include Governor of Bangladesh Bank, Finance Minister and other high-level ministers and elected policymakers. The Governing Board is responsible for overall policy decisions. Executive Board includes bureaucrats from Government of Bangladesh. With Paban Chowdhury being the current Executive Chairman the executive Board oversees the day-to-day operation of the organisation.
Md. Farhanur Rahman, Noakhali

Operation
To capture manufacturing investors from home and abroad in its 100 proposed special economic zones in various parts of the country, BEZA declared flirtatious incentives: duty-free imports on raw material, capital machinery, tax-cut from capital gains etc. for investors in SEZ's.

With Mirsarai Economic Zone (MEZ) situated within the banks of Karnaphuli River near Chattogram Port being the largest SEZ so far is expected to create 150,000 new jobs. There has been initiative to create an export-oriented textile garments park on 500 acres of land which is assume to go production by December 2018. The economic zone also caught investment endorsement from multinational corporations like Wilmar-Adani, China's Zhejiang Jindun Holdings.

With collaboration with BEZA, Meghna Group established the country's first operational private SEZ Meghna Eeconomic Zone in March 2018.

BEZA is also helping China Harbour Engineering to set up a China Industrial Zone of 750 acres of land in Bangladesh for Chinese investors.

Newly established and proposed economic zones
Recently Government has approved 37 new Economic zones, which consists governmental, non-governmental and Specialized Economic zone. Bangladesh government also announced 50pc tax relief in Hi-Tech parks, Economic Zones.
 Agailjhara Economic Zone, Barisal (Under construction)
 Anowara (Gohira) Economic Zone, Chittagong (Under construction)
 Anowara Economic Zone-2, Chittagong (Under construction)
 Ashuganj Economic Zone (Under construction)
 Bagerhat Economic Zone (Under construction)
 Bhola Economic Zone (Under construction)
 Cox's Bazar Free trade Zone (Maheskhali)(Under construction)
 Dohar Economic Zone, Dhaka (Under construction)
 Habiganj Economic Zone (Under construction)
 Jaliardip Economic Zone, Teknaf-Cox's Bazar (Under construction)
 Jamalpur Economic Zone (Approved)
 Kushtia Economic Zone (Under construction)
 Maheskhali Economic Zone-1 (Under construction)
 Maheskhali Economic Zone-2 (Under construction)
 Maheskhali Economic Zone-3 (Under construction)
 Manikganj Economic Zone (Under construction)
 Mirsarai Economic Zone, Chittagong (Under construction)
 Narayangonj Economic Zone (Under construction)
 Narayangonj Economic Zone-2 (Under construction)
 Narshingdi Economic Zone (Under construction)
 Natore Economic Zone (Under construction)
 Nilphamari Economic Zone (Under construction)
 Panchagar Economic Zone (Under construction)
 Sabrang Special Economic Zone (Under construction)
 Shariatpur Economic Zone (Under construction)
 Shariatpur Economic Zone-2 (Under construction)
 Sirajganj Economic Zone (Under construction)
 Srihotto Economic Zone, Maulavibazar (Under construction)
 Sripur Economic Zone (Japanese Economic Zone), Gazipur (Under construction)

Non-government economic zones
Government also encouraged building of private economic zone. Some are under construction and some are operational.
 A.K. Khan Economic Zone (operational)
 Abdul Monem Economic Zone (operational)
 Abul Khair Economic Zone
 Akij Economic Zone
 Aliance Economic Zone
 Aman Economic Zone
 Anowar Economic Zone
 Arisha Economic Zone
 Bashundhara Economic Zone
 Bay Economic Zone
 BGMEA Garments industrial park (operational)
 Chatak Economic Zone
 City Economic Zone 
 City Special Economic Zone
 Cumilla Economic Zone (operational)
 East-Coast Group Economic Zone
 East-West Special Economic Zone
 Famkam Economic Zone (Proposed)
 Hamid Economic Zone
 Hoshendi Economic Zone
 Karnaphuli Dry Dock Special Economic Zone 
 Kazi Farms Economic Zone Ltd.
 Kishoreganj Economic Zone (Under Construction)
 Meghna Economic Zone (Under Construction)
 Meghna Industrial Economic Zone (Under Construction)
 PowerPac Economic Zone (Mongla)
 Sirajganj Economic Zone
 Sonargaon Economic Zone (operational)
 Standard Global Economic Zone

Government to government economic zones
 Chinese Economic and Industrial Zone (CEIZ)
 Indian Economic Zone (Kushtia)
 Indian Economic Zone (Mongla)
 Japanese Economic Zone (Araihazar EZ)

Public private partnership (PPP) economic zones
 Mirsarai EZ (1st Phase): The Powerpac-East West –Gasmin JV is the developer for this zone
 Mongla EZ : Mongla EZ is the first PPP EZ in Bangladesh. The developer of first PPP EZ are PowerPac-PPMKPPL JV

Science- and technology-based economic zones
Bangladesh government Establishing Science and technology based Economic zone to attract foreign FDI. Some projects like Kaliakoir high tech park helped by World bank and DFID.
 Barisal high tech park (land acquiring)
 Chittagong high tech park (land acquiring)
 CUET IT business incubator centre, Chittagong (under construction)
 Dhaka high tech park (proposed)
 Janata tower Software Park (completed)
 Jessore Software Technology Park (under construction)
 Kaliakoir high tech park (block development ongoing)
 Keranigonj Special IT Economic Zone, Dhaka (under construction)
 Khulna high tech park (proposed)
 Mohakhali IT Village (land acquiring)
 Rajhshahi high tech park (land acquiring)
 Rangpur high tech park (land acquiring)
 Sylhet Electronic City (under construction)
 Sylhet high tech park (Land acquiring)
 United City IT Park Ltd

Tourism-based economic zones
 Naf Tourism Park (Jaliardwip)
 Sabrang Tourism Park
 Sonadia Tourism Park

See also
 Special economic zone

External links

References

2010 establishments in Bangladesh
Organisations based in Dhaka
Government agencies of Bangladesh
Special economic zones of Bangladesh
Regulators of Bangladesh